The Herrera River is a river of Río Grande, Puerto Rico. It begins at barrio Ciénaga Alta, in Río Grande and travels through Loiza, Puerto Rico, another municipality. It runs generally from south to north.

See also
List of rivers of Puerto Rico

References

External links
 USGS Hydrologic Unit Map – Caribbean Region (1974)

Rivers of Puerto Rico